Puma Energy is a Swiss multinational mid- and downstream oil company, majority-owned by Singapore-based French company Trafigura.

Its operations span around 40 countries across five continents and encompass the supply, storage, refining, distribution, and retail of a range of petroleum products.

The company employs over 3,500 staff and is headquartered in Singapore with regional hubs in Geneva, Johannesburg, San Juan, Brisbane, and Tallinn.

History 

The Puma brand was created in Argentina in 1929 by "Compañía General de Combustibles S.A." (CGC). CGC was founded in 1920 to transport and market crude oil and its by-products around the country. By the end of the decade CGC was operating its own-brand service stations in Argentina under the Puma name. Between 1930 and 1996 Puma brand's profile in the Argentinian market increased through an expansion in the number of retail sites and investments in advertising. The Puma brand soon travelled further afield after CGC established Puma service stations in Ecuador, in order to supplement its crude oil exploration activities.

In 1994, CGC (then owned by Santiago Soldati's family) merged to other two local oil companies, Astra and Isaura (which had an own refinery in Bahía Blanca), to form a new company, named "Eg3". Nevertheless, the company only lasted two years as a private enterprise so it was acquired by Spanish Repsol (which already owned 33% of Astra after acquiring it for US$360 million) in 1997. Repsol kept the Eg3 brand and stations, but two years later sold the company to Brazilian corporation Petrobras for US$1,000 million. The Brazilian corporation dissolved Eg3, renaming all its stations (a total of 800) as Petrobras.

In 1997, Swiss multinational corporation Trafigura purchased the rights to the Puma brand ushering in a new phase of development for Puma. The "new" firm was founded in Central America in 1997 as an oil storage and distribution network, and is now active in Latin America, Africa, Europe, the Middle East, Asia, and Australia. It was acquired by Trafigura in 2000. In 2010 the firm announced the acquisition of five retail companies from BP Africa. Since then it has acquired further fuel marketing assets in Central America, the Caribbean, Southeast Asia, and Australia.

On 1 July 2020 Chevron Australia Downstream Pty Ltd, a wholly owned subsidiary of Chevron Corp., announced that it has completed the acquisition from Puma Energy Asia Pacific B.V. of all shares and equity interests of Puma Energy (Australia) Holdings Pty Ltd for the amount of AU$425 million. In April 2021, it was announced that Trafigura control of Puma Energy would increase to over 90% after Angolan company Sonangol Group agreed to sell its stake for US$600 million.

Operations

Africa
The firm has operations in nineteen West, Central and Southern African countries. It entered the African market in Congo-Brazzaville in 2002 before expanding into Ghana. Mozambique, Nigeria, Ivory Coast, the Democratic Republic of Congo, and Angola as one of the largest investors in the sub-Saharan downstream sector. In September 2011 Puma completed the deal to acquire BP's downstream interests in Namibia (100%), Botswana (100%), Zambia (75%), Malawi (50%) and Tanzania (50%) for US$296 million.  The deal handed the company a portfolio of retail assets across the five countries, comprising commercial and aviation fuel, lubricants, over 190 service stations, several storage depots and an import terminal.

The Botswana business accounted for a significant share of the total price and marked the first time the firm had entered a landlocked African country, giving the firm a cross-continental presence from Namibia to Mozambique.

Also in 2010 the firm formed an alliance with Castrol to distribute lubricant brands in the new Southern African markets, as well as Angola and the Democratic Republic of the Congo. In 2012 the firm acquired two  import terminals for liquefied petroleum gas in Benin and Senegal.

In 2015 the firm expanded its operations in South Africa through the acquisition of  Brent Oil and Drakensberg Oil's local retail assets and lubricant business. The firm currently has 145 retail sites in South Africa.

In 2016 Puma Energy delivered its first cargo of bitumen in Nigeria under a joint venture with Wabeco Petroleum Ltd.

Latin America

In 2010 Puma Energy formed a regional subsidiary, Puma Energy Caribe, which bought Caribbean Petroleum Corporation's fire-damaged fuel depot in Puerto Rico and 147 Gulf-branded service stations. In March 2012 the firm acquired ExxonMobil's downstream businesses in Guatemala, El Salvador, Honduras, Nicaragua, Panama, and Belize, establishing it as one of the region's largest petroleum companies.

In July 2012 the firm purchased Chevron's fuel distribution and storage businesses in Puerto Rico and the  United States Virgin Islands.
A further acquisition from ExxonMobil was made in November 2012 by the purchase of Esso Standard Oil's supply and marketing business in the Dominican Republic.   In February 2013 Puma Energy and Castrol formed a new partnership to market Castrol lubricants in all six of Puma's Central American markets as well as Paraguay.

In March 2015 Puma Energy purchased all the assets of the Colombian fuel storage and distribution firm Save Combustibles, including 135 service stations. The deal was the company's first acquisition in Colombia.

The brand Puma returned to Argentina in May 2016, when the company opened a petrol station in Saladillo, after Trafigura acquired Brazilian company Petrobras' local assets for US$90 million. As a result, a total of 250 former Petrobras stations (operated by local firm Pampa Energía) were rebranded as Puma. With the purchase, Puma Energy also took control of an oil refinery in Bahía Blanca, and other plants in Avellaneda and Santa Cruz Province. With a 4,9% market share, Puma ranked as the fourth petroleum brand in Argentina after YPF (55,1%), Shell and Axion.

Asia-Pacific

In July 2012 Puma Energy announced its acquisition of Singapore-based Chevron Kuo Pte, owner of a 70% share of Chevron Bitumen Vietnam – an importer and distributor of asphalt for infrastructure projects in Vietnam. The deal was completed in November 2012. Thus, the firm expanded its activities into the global bitumen market.

In October 2012 Indonesian oil and gas company MedcoEnergi signed an agreement with Puma Energy to sell a 64% stake in its liquid-fuel storage and distribution subsidiary, PT Medco Sarana Kalibaru (MSK).

In January 2013, Puma Energy entered the Australian market when it bought Neumann Petroleum in Queensland, Australia, in a deal that included a chain of 125 service stations and an $18 million bulk seaboard fuel terminal in Brisbane. In February 2013 the firm doubled its number of Australian petrol stations with the acquisition of Ausfuel (including Gull Petroleum) from Archer Capital for $652 million, becoming the country's largest independent fuel retailer. In February 2013 it bought Central Combined Group, the largest independent fuel marketer in central Queensland. In December 2019, Puma Energy agreed terms to sell its Australian operations to Chevron, finalised in mid-2020. Since early 2022, the Puma Energy stations in the country were progressively rebranded to Chevron's Caltex brand.

In June 2014 Puma Energy acquired InterOil Corp (IOC)'s Napa Napa oil refinery, 52 service stations and 30 fuel depots, terminal and aviation sites in Papua New Guinea for $526 million.

In November 2014 Puma Energy opened the Langsat Bitumen Terminal, a 74,000-tonne bitumen storage facility in Johor, Malaysia.

In October 2015 Puma Energy signed a joint-venture agreement with Myanmar government-owned Myanmar Petroleum Products Enterprise (MPPE) to form National Energy Puma Aviation Services (NEPAS). The new entity will distribute aviation fuel to 11 airports across Myanmar. In NEPAS was deconsolidated from Puma Energy in the first quarter of 2022.

Europe
In March 2015 Puma Energy made its first acquisition in the United Kingdom, purchasing the disused Milford Haven Refinery in Wales from Murphy Oil subsidiary Murco Petroleum for use as a fuel storage site.

In 2016 Puma Energy signed a purchase agreement with BP to buy its bulk storage fuel terminal in Belfast, Northern Ireland.

Ownership
Trafigura is Puma Energy's biggest shareholder, with a 96% stake. The remaining minority shares are owned by private shareholders. 

In December 2012 the Financial Times reported that Trafigura had designated 2014 as the 'earliest' date for a public offering of Puma Energy, with London the most likely market.  A Reuters article that week quoted a company statement saying that Puma Energy was "well funded by its existing shareholders" and had "no immediate needs to go to the public markets" and that an IPO was "one of various options at some point in the future".

Sports sponsorships
Puma Energy sponsors a number of sporting events in Africa including the Zambia International Rally. In 2012 the firm sponsored the Malawi Open Tennis Championship.  In 2012, the firm joined forces with an insurance company Madison General to sponsor Zambian national rally champion Mohammed Essa.  The two firms renewed their sponsorship of Essa in February 2013.

References

External links

 

Oil pipeline companies
Oil and gas companies of Singapore
1929 establishments in Argentina
1997 mergers and acquisitions